Howard Wilson Benge (26 July 1913 – 19 May 1986) was a New Zealand rower who won a bronze medal representing his country at the 1938 British Empire Games.

Biography
Born on 26 July 1913, Benge was the son of Annie Elizabeth Benge (née Wilson) and her husband, George Frederick Benge.

He won the bronze medal at the 1938 British Empire Games as part of the men's eight. He was a member of the Union Boat Club (UBC) in Wanganui; fellow UBC members in the eight were James Gould and Gus Jackson.

Benge died on 19 May 1986, and was buried in Aramoho Cemetery, Wanganui.

References

1913 births
1986 deaths
Rowers from Whanganui
New Zealand male rowers
Rowers at the 1938 British Empire Games
Commonwealth Games bronze medallists for New Zealand
Commonwealth Games medallists in rowing
Burials at Aramoho Cemetery
20th-century New Zealand people
Medallists at the 1938 British Empire Games